The 2008–09 season is Panionios is 118th season in existence and its 48th in the top tier of the modern Greek football league system. They will also compete in the Greek Cup and UEFA Intertoto Cup. This year Álvaro Recoba the star of Uruguay who was in Inter Milan for years transferred to Panionios on September. He came to Athens with his compatriot Fabián Estoyanoff who also signs his contract with Panionios.

The club's U-17, U-20 will compete in Youth levels

Current squad

Transfers

In

Out

Matches

2008–09 Super League Greece

2008–09 Greek Cup

2008 UEFA Intertoto Cup

Top goalscorers

References

Panionios F.C. seasons
Panionios